The 1990 United States Senate special election in Indiana was a special election held on November 6, 1990, in order to fill the Class III seat in the United States Senate from Indiana for the remainder of the term ending January 3, 1993. Incumbent Republican U.S. Senator Dan Coats, who was recently appointed to this seat two years prior, won election to serve out the remainder of the term.

Background 
During the 1988 presidential election, Republican nominee Vice President George H. W. Bush selected U.S. Senator Dan Quayle of Indiana as his vice presidential nominee. The Bush-Quayle ticket defeated the Dukakis-Bentsen ticket in the general election by a 53%-46% margin, capturing 40 states and 426 electoral votes.

In order to assume the vice presidency in January 1989, Quayle was required to resign his seat in the Senate. In preparation for the pending vacancy, Governor Robert D. Orr appointed four-term U.S. Representative Dan Coats to fill Quayle's seat on December 12, 1988. Coats was a former aide to Quayle, whom he had succeeded as U.S. Representative for Indiana's 4th congressional district in 1981, and had just been elected to a fifth term from that seat. Quayle eventually resigned his Senate seat on January 3, 1989, and Coats was immediately sworn in as his successor.

Candidates

Democratic 
 Baron Hill, State Representative

Republican 
 Dan Coats, incumbent U.S. Senator

Campaign 
In 1990, a special election was held to decide who would serve the balance of Quayle's term, ending in 1993. Coats faced Democrat Baron Hill, a state representative from Seymour, in the general election. Coats used television commercials that raised questions about Hill's consistency in opposing new taxes, and Hill gained notoriety for walking the length of the state to meet voters.

Results

Notes

See also 
 List of United States senators from Indiana
 1990 United States Senate elections

1990
Indiana
United States Senate
Indiana 1990
United States Senate 1990
Indiana